Shahan Dasht (also Romanized as Shāhān Dasht or Shahandasht), locally known as Shoon Dasht, is a village in Bala Larijan Rural District, Larijan District, Amol County, Mazandaran Province, Iran.

At the 2006 census, its population was 21, in 9 families. During the summer, the population increases, since many city dwellers from Amol stay in Shahandasht as their summer residence.

The Shahan Dasht waterfall is a natural attraction of the province. The Malek Bahman castle is also a historical castle attracting visitors in the village.

Shahandasht village is a 3,500-year-old village and a historical and scenic village located in the north of Iran in the city of Amol. This village, with 4 registered national monuments in “Iran National Monuments”, is one of the ecotourism villages and one of the most spectacular and historical villages in Iran.

Mosque (Tekiyeh/ local dialect) of Shahandasht 
It belongs to the Qajar period and is located in Amol city, Larijan district, Shahandasht village and this monoument was registered as one of the national monuments of Iran on August 28, 2003 with the registration number 9354.

Shahandasht waterfall 

It is the largest waterfall in Mazandaran province. It is one of the national monuments of the country in the list of “Iran National Monuments”. This waterfall, permanent and huge, shows itself in a magnificent and indescribable way on the south side of Haraz road and river. Which falls down from Malek Bahman Castle on a pyramidal mountain overlooking Shahandasht village. In the heights overlooking Shahandasht village, Shahandasht main waterfall with a height of 51 meters is the largest waterfall in Mazandaran province. This waterfall has three waterfalls which the total height of them are 180 meters. At the top of Shahandasht waterfall is Malek Bahman Castle, which is known as Queen Qala Castle or Malek Bahman and its historical name is Fereshteh (queen in Persian) Castle, it is one of the largest mountain castles in Alborz mountain, Iran, which is made of stone and a kind of soil that is a mixture of milk and eggs. It is a kind of soil which has a great strength that dates back to three thousand years ago.

Si tower (30 in Persian) 
It belongs to pre-Islamic times and it is located in the village of Shahandasht, Amol city, Larijan district, and this monoument was registered on August 28, 2003 with the registration number 9356 as one of the national monuments of Iran.

Malek Bahman Castle 

Malek Bahman Or Malek Qala castle belongs to pre-Islamic times and it is located in the village of Shahandasht, Amol city, Larijan district, and this monoument was registered as one of the national monuments of Iran on August 10, 2000 with the registration number 2778. This castle is one of the greatest castles of Alborz and Iran which is located in Haraz road, Larijan section of Amol city and overlooking Shahandasht village, 75 km south of Amol. This castle belongs to the rulers of Padusbanian who ruled Royan, Noor, Kojoor and Rostamdaa. The castle was built on a rock about 220 meters above the lands of Shahandasht from the remains of large and small stones and gypsum mortar in stages, which includes rooms and different parts of the building. This castle was conquered by order of Shah Abbas Safavid in 1626.

Elias Tangeh Cave 
Elias Tangeh Cave is located in 85 km northeast of Tehran, 75 km south of Amol city in Shahandasht village. The use of the name As Tangeh Cave is common among the people of the region. The cave is located on the southwestern slope of Elias Tangeh valley. There is a dirt road of livestock crossing about 2 km in the distance between Shahandasht village To the entrance of the cave. 
Other attractions are Kabutar Keli cave, Shona plain, Takhtesangi (slate), historical and mud houses as well as the three-arched (setaq) crypts, Imamzadeh Elias, Cheshmeh Khozak and Tekiye Shahandasht (mosque). During the previous years, many stone inscriptions with Kufic script appeared in this village. This village is a small part of Amard and Amol thousand years old antiquity. 
Souvenirs of this village are cherries, sour cherries, apples, walnuts, raspberries, blackberries, pears, apricots due to its mountainous nature. Of course, mountain bread and the special bread for the people of Mazandaran are also given to tourists in this village. This village is 1500 meters above the sea level. Alleys, springs and gardens of Shahandasht are also beautiful and spectacular and there have hospitable people.

References 

Populated places in Amol County
Tourist attractions in Amol